Xonobod (in 1972—91 Sovetabad) is a district-level city in Andijan Region, Uzbekistan. It lies to the east of Andijan in the Ferghana Valley, on the right bank of the Kara Darya.

See also
 List of renamed cities in Uzbekistan

References

Populated places in Andijan Region
Cities in Uzbekistan